Zhou Xiaojing (born August 10, 1977) is a Chinese rhythmic gymnast.

Zhou represented China in the rhythmic gymnastics individual all-around competition at two Olympic Games: in 1996 in Atlanta and in 2000 in Sydney. In 1996 she tied for 16th place in the qualification round and advanced to the semifinal, where she placed 17th and didn't advance to the final of 10 competitors. In 2000, she was 20th in the qualification and didn't advance to the final.

References

External links 
 
 

1977 births
Living people
People from Rui'an
People from Wenzhou
People from Zhejiang
Sportspeople from Zhejiang
Gymnasts from Zhejiang
Chinese rhythmic gymnasts
Gymnasts at the 1996 Summer Olympics
Gymnasts at the 2000 Summer Olympics
Olympic gymnasts of China
Asian Games medalists in gymnastics
Gymnasts at the 1994 Asian Games
Gymnasts at the 1998 Asian Games
Asian Games gold medalists for China
Asian Games silver medalists for China
Medalists at the 1994 Asian Games
Medalists at the 1998 Asian Games
20th-century Chinese women